Arttu Kangas (born 13 July 1993) is a Finnish athlete specialising in the shot put. He represented his country at three outdoor and two indoor European Championships without qualifying for the final.

His personal bests in the event are 20.30 metres outdoors (Raseborg 2016) and 20.18 metres indoors (Jyväskylä 2017).

International competitions

References

1993 births
Living people
Finnish male shot putters
Athletes (track and field) at the 2010 Summer Youth Olympics
Finnish Athletics Championships winners
20th-century Finnish people
21st-century Finnish people